La Nya Pendé or Nya Pendé is one of six departments in Logone Oriental, a region of Chad. Its capital is Goré.

Departments of Chad
Logone Oriental Region